Tarradale Castle was a castle that was located near Muir of Ord, Scotland, most likely northwest of Tarradale House. King Robert the Bruce captured and destroyed the castle in 1308.

Tarradale House was built on the site in 1680. The geologist Sir Roderick Murchison was born there in 1792.

Citations

Castles in Highland (council area)
Demolished buildings and structures in Scotland
Former castles in Scotland